Littleheath Woods is the collective name for Littleheath Wood, Foxearth Woods, part of Queenhill Shaw and part of Gee Wood in Selsdon in the London Borough of Croydon. It is owned by Croydon Council and the Friends of Littleheath Woods assist with the management.

The woods have tall oaks above a layer of sweet chestnut, rowan and birch, and there are several areas of grassland. Plants include wood anemone, bluebell and greater stitchwort and at the southern end there is a small pond with amphibious bistort and brooklime. In the north there is acid grassland.

There is access from neighbouring roads including Croham Valley Road, Littleheath Road, Edgecoombe and Foxearth Road.

The wood was once used for shooting and a pheasantry was established on part of the land. Much of the low-level planting was established to provide cover for the game-birds.

The soil (soft sand) is of a type suitable for badgers and there are active setts within the woodland.

References

External links
Littleheath Woods and Edgecoombe at London Borough of Croydon website

Friends of Littleheath Woods

Parks and open spaces in the London Borough of Croydon